Jonathan Edmund Alexander Brady (born 14 January 1975) is an Australian soccer coach and former player who is the manager of English club Northampton Town.

Playing career
After failing to break into the first team at Wycombe Wanderers, Brady joined Hayes via a spell in Norway. He played 188 games for the Missioners in all competitions, scoring 20 goals, before transferring to Rushden & Diamonds in the summer of 1998.

Brady was a Football Conference champion with Rushden & Diamonds in 2000–01, scoring the winner at his future club Chester City on the final day of the season to make promotion mathematically certain. The following season saw him appear on the losing side for the Diamonds against Cheltenham Town in the Division Three play-off final at the Millennium Stadium.

After a brief spell at Woking, he joined Chester City and once again suffered play-off disappointment, losing the inaugural Football Conference play-offs at the semi-final stage to Doncaster Rovers. He was released from his Chester contract during their 2003–04 title winning campaign in order to join the coaching staff of Arsenal, but soon resumed his playing career with Stevenage Borough.

After losing the 2005 Conference play-off final to Carlisle United, Brady signed for Hereford United.

He subsequently joined Cambridge United, before a loan spell with Kidderminster Harriers in March 2007. He signed for Conference North side Kettering Town in June 2007.

Coaching career
Brady was appointed manager of Brackley Town in March 2009.

On 6 September 2015, Brady stepped down as manager of Brackley Town.

Northampton Town
He joined Northampton Town as U16 coach in 2016 and was promoted to U18 coach in 2017.

Following the sacking of Keith Curle on 10 February 2021, Brady was placed in temporary charge of the first team. On 4 March, it was confirmed that Brady would remain in charge of the first-team until the end of the season. In the penultimate match of the season, Northampton were beaten 3–0 by Blackpool, a result that saw Northampton immediately relegated back to League Two. Despite the relegation however Brady was appointed permanent manager in May 2021.

Career statistics

Managerial statistics

References

External links
 OzFootball profile
 

1975 births
Living people
Australian soccer players
Australian expatriate soccer players
Brentford F.C. players
Swansea City A.F.C. players
Wycombe Wanderers F.C. players
FK Mjølner players
Hayes F.C. players
Rushden & Diamonds F.C. players
Woking F.C. players
Chester City F.C. players
Stevenage F.C. players
Hereford United F.C. players
Cambridge United F.C. players
Kidderminster Harriers F.C. players
Kettering Town F.C. players
Brackley Town F.C. players
English Football League players
National League (English football) players
Sportspeople from Newcastle, New South Wales
People from Newcastle, New South Wales
Brackley Town F.C. managers
Association football wingers
Northampton Town F.C. non-playing staff
Northampton Town F.C. managers
National League (English football) managers
Southern Football League managers
English Football League managers
Australian soccer coaches
Association football coaches